John's Burnt Mill Bridge, also known as Camelback Bridge, is a historic stone arch bridge in Mount Pleasant Township, Adams County, Pennsylvania. The bridge crosses the South Branch Conewago Creek.

It was added to the National Register of Historic Places in 1974.

References

Road bridges on the National Register of Historic Places in Pennsylvania
Bridges completed in 1823
Bridges in Adams County, Pennsylvania
National Register of Historic Places in Adams County, Pennsylvania
Stone arch bridges in the United States